Prathibhavanthudu is a 1986 Indian Telugu-language film written and directed by Prabhakar Reddy and produced by S. Ramachandra Rao for SR Films, starring Krishna Ghattamaneni and Bhanupriya in the lead roles. The film has musical score by Chellapilla Satyam.

Cast 
 Krishna Ghattamaneni
 Bhanupriya
 Gummadi
 Prasad Babu
 Sridhar

Soundtrack 
Chellapilla Satyam scored and composed the film's soundtrack, while Athreya penned the lyrics.
 "Adi Nenanukunnana" -
 "Amrutham Tagina" (Sad) -
 "Amrutham Tagina" -
 "Chuputho Banamese" -
 "Chustava Chudarani" -
 "O Yemmo Etta" -

References

External links 
 Prathibhavanthudu on Gaana

1986 films
1980s Telugu-language films
Indian action films
Films scored by Satyam (composer)
1986 action films